Khalilou Sall (Saint Louis, October 3, 1926-Dakar, April 16, 2008) was a Senegalese politician and engineer. He was one of the founders of the PAI.

Life
He studied at the Lycée Pierre-de-Fermat in Toulouse and at the ESME-Sudria in Paris, and he worked as an engineer in France, he came back to Senegal in 1957.

Due to disagreements with Sékou Touré, he moved to Bamako, Mali in 1962. He came back in 1963.

In 1968, president Léopold Sédar Senghor put him in charge of a Senegalese railway project and he worked for the African Development Bank (1971-1977)

Bibliography
 Amadou Booker Washington Sadji, Le rôle de la génération charnière ouest-africaine : indépendance et développement, L’Harmattan, 2006
 Majhemout Diop, Mémoires de luttes : textes pour servir à l’histoire du Parti africain de l’indépendance, Présence africaine, 2007
 Flux, Revue des ingénieurs Supelec, 2009

1926 births
2008 deaths
Lycée Pierre-de-Fermat alumni
Senegalese engineers
Senegalese politicians